Woodlake is a census-designated place in Chesterfield County, Virginia. The population as of the 2010 Census was 7,319. The suburban community is located on the west shore of Swift Creek Reservoir.

References

Census-designated places in Chesterfield County, Virginia
Census-designated places in Virginia